Aksharathettu may refer to:

 Aksharathettu (film), a 1989 Malayalam film
 Aksharathettu (TV series), an Indian Malayalam television series